Russell Kenneth Alexander Martin (born 4 January 1986) is a professional football manager and former player. He is the head coach of Championship club Swansea City.

A former defender, Martin began his playing career at Brighton & Hove Albion's youth academy. He established himself at Wycombe Wanderers in 2004, before moving to Peterborough United in 2008. Martin joined Norwich City in 2010 and made 309 appearances for the club. He then had brief spells with Rangers, Walsall and Milton Keynes Dons. During his playing career, Martin won five promotions (including two Premier League promotions) and was named in the 2014–15 Championship Team of the Year by the Professional Footballers' Association.

Although born in Brighton, England, Martin played in 29 internationals for Scotland. He moved into management in 2019 with Milton Keynes Dons and became head coach of Swansea City in 2021.

Martin grew up supporting Leeds United.

Club career

Early career
Born in Brighton, East Sussex, Martin was educated at Varndean School. He joined Brighton & Hove Albion's youth academy before leaving by mutual consent in early 2004 to join Isthmian League Division One South side Lewes. He then had trials with several clubs, including Charlton Athletic.

Martin joined Wycombe Wanderers in 2004. He made his debut in a 2–1 home victory over Cambridge United on 7 August 2004, then went on to make ten more appearances during the 2004–05 season. Ahead of the 2006–07 season, Martin signed a new two-year contract with the club. In the following season, he played in the League Two semi-final against Stockport County, which Wycombe lost 2–1 on aggregate.

On 29 May 2008, Martin moved to Peterborough United, who had just been promoted to League One. He signed a three-year contract. Martin became the club's youngest ever captain after taking over from Craig Morgan. In his first season at Peterborough, Martin captained the club to gain promotion to the Championship.

Norwich City

Following Mark Cooper's appointment as a replacement for Darren Ferguson in November 2009, Martin joined Norwich City on loan. On 4 January 2010, his transfer was made permanent and he joined Norwich on a -year contract. Martin scored his first goal for Norwich in the 3–1 defeat to Doncaster Rovers, with a diving header on 14 September 2010. He scored the only goal in a 1–0 victory over Championship league leaders Queens Park Rangers on 1 January 2011, and a last-minute equaliser against Cardiff City, leading fans to dub him "the Cafu of the Championship" or "the Norfolk Cafu", in honour of Cafu. On 7 May 2011, he was the runner up for the Norwich City Player of the Year award to winner Grant Holt, in a season where he played every minute of each game. 

After an impressive first season in the Premier League with Norwich, filling in well at centre back during some games, Martin signed a new three-year deal in June 2012. On 29 December 2012, Martin scored two goals against Manchester City in a 4–3 home defeat. On 9 July 2013, Martin agreed a new three-year deal with the club. On 10 August 2013, he was officially named the club captain. In a 2013 interview, Martin revealed his desire to take up management after the end of his playing career, stating, "I would eventually love to come and manage Norwich."

On 22 November 2014, Martin made his 200th appearance for Norwich against his hometown club Brighton & Hove Albion. He scored Norwich's second goal in a 3–3 draw. Norwich were promoted to the Premier League in the 2014–15 season via the playoffs, a year after their relegation, but were relegated again after just one season back in the top division. Martin made his 300th appearance for Norwich on 21 April 2017, in a 2–0 win against Brighton & Hove Albion. He signed a new contract with Norwich in July 2017, but then had few first team appearances during the 2017–18 season.

Rangers (loan)
In January 2018, Martin moved on loan to Scottish Premiership club Rangers. He made his competitive debut for the club on 24 January, in a 2–0 win against Aberdeen. Martin was one of four players to make their first appearance for Rangers in that game. He scored his first (and only) goal for Rangers in a 2–0 win against Hearts on 24 February 2018.

Following his loan with Rangers, Martin left Norwich City on 31 August 2018 after his contract was terminated by mutual consent. He made 309 appearances for Norwich, placing him 22nd in the club's all-time appearance list.

Final years and retirement
Martin signed for League One club Walsall in October 2018 in a player-coach role. He left by mutual consent in January 2019, for family reasons, having made twelve appearances for the club.

On 15 January 2019, Martin joined League Two club Milton Keynes Dons on a short-term deal until the end of the season, and played a key role in the club clinching promotion on the final day of the season. Following the departure of manager Paul Tisdale on 2 November 2019, Martin was appointed as his successor in his first managerial position the following day and later announced his retirement as a player to concentrate on the role.

International career
Martin, who was born in England, qualifies to play for Scotland through his Scottish father. On 17 May 2011, he was named in the Scotland squad for the Nations Cup games against Wales and the Republic of Ireland, making his debut as a late substitute against Wales. Martin remarked before a game against Croatia in June 2013 that he was not recognised by Scottish taxi drivers transporting him for Scotland matches. Martin made his first competitive appearance for Scotland in that match against Croatia, which Scotland won 1–0 with then Norwich City teammate Robert Snodgrass scoring the only goal.

Managerial career

Milton Keynes Dons
On 3 November 2019, following the departure of manager Paul Tisdale, Martin was announced as the new permanent first-team manager of League One club Milton Keynes Dons – the club he had joined as a player earlier in the year. Following his appointment, the club finished 19th in League One, with the season finishing prematurely due to the COVID-19 pandemic.

Martin, alongside assistant Luke Williams, installed a possession-based style of play at the club which received widespread plaudits. On 2 March 2021, Martin's side scored after a 56-pass move, a new British record at the time. At the culmination of the 2020–21 season, only Manchester City and Barcelona had a higher average possession percentage in Europe than Martin's MK Dons. His team also had the most touches in the opposition box in League One, despite mixed results throughout the season which saw the club finishing 13th in the league.

On 31 July 2021, MK Dons confirmed that Championship club Swansea City had requested to speak to Martin about him becoming their new manager.

Swansea City
On 1 August 2021, Martin was named head coach of Swansea City, signing a three-year contract. He was appointed six days before the first game of the 2021–22 Championship season. He was joined by his assistants Luke Williams, Matthew Gill, and Dean Thornton. 

His first game in charge was a 2–1 away loss to Blackburn Rovers, which was followed by a 3–0 away win against Reading in the EFL Cup. Martin's first home game was a 0–0 draw with Sheffield United at the Swansea.com Stadium. On 20 August, Martin won his first league game as Swansea beat Bristol City 1–0. In October, Martin led Swansea to a 3–0 win against rivals Cardiff City in the South Wales derby. Later in the season, Swansea beat Cardiff 4–0 in the reverse fixture; Swansea became the first side to complete the league double in the derby's 110-year history. Martin said, "I have not felt as emotional as this after a game... to watch the backroom staff and the players enjoy that with the supporters was the best moment I've had as a manager I'd say."

In his first season at the club, Swansea finished 15th in the league.

Managerial style

Martin began studying for his coaching badges at age 22, and studied for his UEFA Pro Licence at the Scottish FA in 2019. His managerial style has been influenced by such managers as Chris Hughton, Daniel Farke, and Pep Guardiola. Inspired by Guardiola's Barcelona and Manchester City teams, Martin prefers his teams to dominate ball possession. Tactically, he prefers the 3–4–2–1 or 3–5–2 formations, with an emphasis on passing the ball and pressing the opposition. If his teams suffer a bad result, Martin prefers to improve his game plan, rather than changing the style of play.

After his MK Dons side scored a record-breaking 56-pass goal, Martin said, "People still react to that and say it’s boring, but everyone has a different opinion... the more we have the ball, the more we can control the game and take the fight out of opposition teams. It’s a 90-minute game plan to try and dominate the ball."

Personal life
Martin established a charitable foundation in his hometown of Brighton, initially set up as a football academy, named the Russell Martin Foundation. The charity aims to use "the power of football to help change people’s lives" by providing access to football, education, and health courses in the local community. Martin has been a vegan since 2014, initially for health reasons as he sought to manage issues with ulcerative colitis. He is also a part-owner of Erpingham House, the largest vegan restaurant in the UK. In a 2018 interview, he stated that he had joined the Green Party of England and Wales. He is also a proponent of Buddhism.

Career statistics

Club

International

Managerial record

Honours
Peterborough United
Football League One runner-up: 2008–09

Norwich City
Football League One: 2009–10
Football League Championship runner-up: 2010–11
Football League Championship play-offs: 2015

Milton Keynes Dons
EFL League Two third-place promotion: 2018–19

Individual
PFA Team of the Year: 2014–15 Championship

See also
 List of Scotland international footballers born outside Scotland

References

External links

1986 births
Living people
Footballers from Brighton
English people of Scottish descent
English footballers
Scottish footballers
Scotland international footballers
Association football defenders
Brighton & Hove Albion F.C. players
Lewes F.C. players
Wycombe Wanderers F.C. players
Peterborough United F.C. players
Norwich City F.C. players
Premier League players
English Football League players
Rangers F.C. players
Scottish Professional Football League players
Walsall F.C. players
Milton Keynes Dons F.C. players
Milton Keynes Dons F.C. managers
Swansea City A.F.C. managers
English Football League managers
English football managers
Green Party of England and Wales people
People educated at Varndean College